GD Greenway is a greenway in Guangdong, PRC. Which consists of six trails.

Trails 
Trail 1 From Zhaoqing to Zhuhai via Foshan, Guangzhou and Zhongshan. 310 km long.
Trail 2 From Guangzhou to Huizhou via Zengcheng, Dongguan and Shenzhen. 480 km long.
Trail 3 From Jiangmen to Huizhou via Zhongshan, Guangzhou and Dongguan. 370 km long.
Trail 4 From Guangzhou to Zhuhai via Foshan and Zhongshan. 220 km long.
Trail 5 From Huizhou to Shenzhen via Dongguan. 120 km long.
Trail 6 From Zhaoqing to Jiangmen via Foshan. 190 km long.

References 
Guangdong Greenway - official site 
珠江三角洲绿道网总体规划纲要 

Geography of Guangdong
Tourist attractions in Guangdong
Cycleways in Asia